Suomenlinna (until 1918 Viapori), or Sveaborg, is an inhabited sea fortress composed of eight islands, of which six have been fortified; it is about 4 km southeast of the city center of Helsinki, the capital of Finland. Suomenlinna is popular with tourists and locals, who enjoy it as a picturesque picnic site. Originally named Sveaborg (Castle of the Swedes), or Viapori as referred to by Finnish-speaking Finns, it was renamed in Finnish to Suomenlinna (Castle of Finland) in 1918 for patriotic and nationalistic reasons, though it is still known by its original name in Sweden and by Swedish-speaking Finns.

The Swedish crown commenced the construction of the fortress in 1748 as protection against Russian expansionism. The general responsibility for the fortification work was given to Augustin Ehrensvärd. The original plan of the bastion fortress was strongly influenced by the ideas of Vauban, the foremost military engineer of the time, and the principles of the star fort style of fortification, albeit adapted to a group of rocky islands. Famous for these bastion fortifications, Suomenlinna became a UNESCO World Heritage Site in 1991.

During the Finnish War, Sweden surrendered the fortress to Russia on 3 May 1808, paving the way for the occupation of Finland by Russian forces in 1809, and the eventual cession of Finland to Russia at the conclusion of the war. Russia held the fortress until Finnish independence in 1917.  Finland then managed Suomenlinna through the Defense Department until turning most of it over to civilian control in 1973.

Geography 

The Suomenlinna district of Helsinki lies southeast of downtown Helsinki and consists of eight islands. Five of the islands are connected by either bridges or a sandbar landbridge. Länsi-Mustasaari (sv: Västersvartö) is bridged to Pikku Mustasaari (sv: Lilla Östersvartö), which is bridged to Iso Mustasaari (sv: Stora Östersvartö), which is bridged to Susisaari (sv: Vargö), which was connected to Susiluoto (sv: Vargskär) by filling in the separating waterway during the Russian period. This island, which has the greatest concentration of fortifications was renamed Gustavssvärd (King Gustav's sword) (fi: Kustaanmiekka) during the construction by Sweden. The three unconnected islands are Särkkä (sv: Långören), Lonna (sv: Lonnan), and Pormestarinluodot (sv: Borgmästargrundet). The total land area is 80 hectares (0.8 km2).

Instead of using the normal Finnish postal addressing scheme (consisting of a street name and a house number), the addresses at Suomenlinna consist of a letter code for the island and then a house number. For example, C 83 is house #83 on Iso-Mustasaari (code C). The postal code for the Suomenlinna district is 00190.

History

The Swedish era

Background 

Early on in the Great Northern War, Russia took advantage of Swedish weakness in Ingria (sv: Ingermanland) and captured the area near the Neva River as well as the Swedish forts, Nyen and Nöteborg, built to protect it. In 1703, Peter the Great founded his new capital, Saint Petersburg, in that easternmost corner of the Gulf of Finland. In the approach to it he built the fortified naval base of Kronstadt. Russia soon became a maritime power and a force to be reckoned with in the Baltic Sea. The situation posed a threat to Sweden, which until that time had been the dominant power in the Baltic. This was visibly demonstrated by the use of naval forces in the Russian capture of Viborg in 1710. The main Swedish naval base at Karlskrona was too far to the south to meet Sweden's new needs for its navy in the 18th century, which often resulted in Swedish ships reaching the coast of Finland only after Russian ships and troops had either started or completed their spring campaigns.

The lack of coastal defenses was keenly felt with Russian landings in Helsingfors in the spring of 1713 and the Swedish failure to blockade the Hanko Peninsula in 1714. A Russian naval campaign against the Swedish coast towards the end of the Great Northern War further outlined the need to develop Finnish coastal defenses. Immediately after the war ended the first plans were set in motion in Sweden to construct an archipelago fleet and a base of operations for it in Finland. However, nothing with regard to Sveaborg took place until the end of Russo-Swedish War of 1741–1743. Fortifications were left unfinished at Hamina and Lappeenranta while Hämeenlinna was being built into a supply base. Lack of funds, unwillingness to devote funds for defending Finland, and the belief (arising just before the war) that Russia would be pushed away from the Baltic Sea were the main causes for the lack of progress.

The following Russo-Swedish War of 1741–1743, which quickly turned from a Swedish attack into a Russian occupation of Finland, again underlined the importance of developing fortifications in Finland. Lack of base of operations for naval forces made it difficult for the Swedish navy to operate in the area. Other European states were also concerned about developments regarding Russia, especially France, with whom Sweden had concluded a military alliance. After lengthy debate, the Swedish parliament decided in 1747 to both fortify the Russian frontier and establish a naval base at Helsingfors as a counter to Kronstadt. Augustin Ehrensvärd (1710–1772), a young lieutenant colonel, was given the responsibility of designing the fortresses and directing construction operations.

Construction 
Sweden started building the fortresses in January 1748.  Ehrensvärd's plan contained two fortifications: a sea fortress at Svartholm near the small town of Lovisa, and a larger sea fortress and naval base (Sveaborg) at Helsingfors. There were two main aspects to Ehrensvärd's design for Sveaborg: a series of independent fortifications across several linked islands and, at the very heart of the complex, a navy dockyard. In addition to the island fortress itself, seafacing fortifications on the mainland would ensure that an enemy could not acquire a beach-head from which to stage attacks on the sea fort. The plan was also to stock munitions for the whole Finnish contingent of the Swedish Army and Royal Swedish Navy there. Additional plans were made for fortifying the Hanko Peninsula, but these were postponed.

Construction started in early 1748 kept expanding, and by September there were around 2,500 men building the fortresses. 
Initially the soldiers were housed in the vaults of the fortifications, while the officers had specially built quarters integrated into the baroque cityscape composition of the overall plan. The most ambitious plan was left only half completed: a baroque square on Iso Mustasaari partly based on the model of Place Vendôme in Paris. As the construction work progressed, more residential buildings were built, many following the shape of the fortification lines. Ehrensvärd and some of the other officers were keen artists who made oil paintings presenting a view of life in the fortress during its construction, and giving the impression of a lively "fortress town" community.

Due to repeated Russian threats in 1749 and 1750, more effort was placed on the island fortifications at the expense of those on the mainland, so that a safe base of operations could be secured for the Swedish naval units along the Finnish coast. Using the military garrisoned in Finland as the workforce, construction continued with over 6,000 workers in 1750. Fortifications at Gustavssvärd were completed in 1751 and the main fortifications on Vargö were ready in 1754. The fortress was fully operational though unfinished. These accomplishments did not reduce the pace of construction and in 1755 there were 7,000 workers constructing the fortifications outside of Helsingfors which at the time had around 2,000 residents. The substantial fortification work on the islands south of the town brought it a new and unexpected importance. Swedish participation to the Seven Years' War halted the construction efforts in 1757, which also marked the end of the rapid construction phase of Sveaborg.

This period in Swedish history was known as the Age of Liberty, during which the kingdom was under increased parliamentary control, divided into two political parties, the Hats and the Caps. Ehrensvärd had been supported by the Hats, so when the Caps rose to power in 1766 he was relieved of his post and replaced with ardent Caps supporter Christopher Falkengréen. However, after 1769 when the Hats regained power, Ehrensvärd was again placed in command of the Swedish archipelago fleet in Finland, officially the arméens flotta ("fleet of the army"), and returned to Sveaborg. But additional progress had not been made on the fortifications when Ehrensvärd died in 1772. Efforts to improve the fortress continued under Jacob Magnus Sprengtporten, but his tenure was cut short by disagreements with King Gustav III. Once again efforts slowed down as garrisons were reduced, and in 1776 Sveaborg's commander reported that he could not even man one-tenth of the artillery placed in the fort. Even at the start of the Russo-Swedish War in 1788 Sveaborg remained in an incomplete state.

Facilities for constructing ships for the Swedish archipelago fleet were built at Sveaborg in the 1760s. In 1764 the first three archipelago frigates were launched from there. In addition to the construction of the fortifications and ships, naval officer training was started by Ehrensvärd at his own expense at Sveaborg in 1770. It took until 1779 before a naval military school was formally founded there.

Service 

Sveaborg was formed and stocked according to the needs of the Swedish archipelago fleet and thus was unable to repair and refit the Swedish battlefleet after the battle of Hogland. Facilities were also found lacking at Sveaborg, especially in the areas intended for taking care of the sick and wounded. Russian control of the waters outside of Sveaborg practically blockaded the Swedish battlefleet to Sveaborg. By cutting the coastal sea route past Hangö, Russians prevented supplies from being shipped from Sweden to Sveaborg. The Swedish fleet finally managed to set sail for its base at Karlskrona on 20 November when the Baltic Sea had already frozen severely enough that ice had to be sawed open before some ships could move. The fleet could not overwinter at Sveaborg since it lacked the facilities and supplies for fitting the ships.

While the route to Sweden was open again in late 1788 and in early 1789, Russian ships cut the connection from Sveaborg to Sweden by forming a blockade at Porkkala cape. Sveaborg was the most important location for archipelago fleet's ship construction and fitting during the war. Even so, and despite efforts, several ships remained unfinished at Sveaborg until the end of the war. The importance of Sveaborg did not escape the Russians whose broad operational plan for 1790 included a siege of Sveaborg both from sea and land.

Following a pact between Alexander I and Napoleon, Russia launched a campaign against Sweden and occupied Finland in 1808. The Russians easily took Helsingfors in early 1808 and began bombarding the fortress.
Its commander, Carl Olof Cronstedt, negotiated a cease-fire. When no Swedish reinforcements had arrived by May, Sveaborg, with almost 7,000 men, surrendered. The reasons for Cronstedt's actions remain somewhat unclear; but the hopeless situation, psychological warfare by the Russians, some (possibly) bribed advisors, fear for the lives of a large civilian population, lack of gunpowder, and their physical isolation are some likely causes for the surrender. By the Treaty of Fredrikshamn in 1809, Finland was ceded by Sweden and became an autonomous grand duchy within the Russian Empire. The Swedish period in Finnish history, which had lasted some seven centuries, came to an end.

Under Russian rule 
After taking over the fortress, the Russians started an extensive building program, mostly extra barracks, and extended the dockyard and reinforced the fortification lines. The long period of peace following the transfer of power was shattered by the Crimean War of 1853–56. The French–English–Ottoman alliance decided to engage Russia on two fronts and sent an Anglo-French fleet to the Baltic Sea. For two summers during the Åland War the fleet shelled the towns and fortifications along the Finnish coast. The bombardment of Sveaborg (also known then as Viapori) by the forces of Richard Saunders Dundas and Charles Pénaud on 9–10 August 1855 lasted 47 hours and the fortress was badly damaged, but they were unable to knock out the Russian guns. After the bombardment, the Anglo-French fleet sent no troops ashore and instead set sail for Kronstadt.

After the Crimean War extensive restoration work was begun at Sveaborg. A new ring of earthworks with artillery emplacements was built at the western and southern edges of the islands.

The next stage in the arming of Sveaborg and the Gulf of Finland came in the build-up to World War I. The fortress and its surrounding islands became part of "Peter the Great's naval fortification" designed to safeguard the capital, Saint Petersburg.

Finnish ownership 

Following the Russian Revolution in 1917, the fortress became a possession of an independent Finland. After the Finnish Civil War, a prison camp existed on the island. The fortress was officially renamed Suomenlinna (castle of Finland) as part of the wave of nationalism.

No longer very practical as a military base, Suomenlinna was turned over to civilian administration in 1973. An independent government department, the Governing Body of Suomenlinna, was formed to administer the unique complex. At the time there was some debate over its Finnish name, with some suggesting that the old name Viapori be restored, but the newer name was retained. The presence of the military on the islands has been drastically scaled down in recent decades. The Suomenlinna garrison houses the Naval Academy of the Finnish Navy on Pikku Mustasaari. Suomenlinna still flies the war flag, or the swallow-tailed state flag of Finland.

Present day 
Suomenlinna is now one of the most popular tourist attractions in Helsinki as well as a popular picnicking spot for the city's inhabitants.  In 2009, a record 713,000 people visited Suomenlinna, most between May and September. A number of museums exist on the island, as well as the last surviving Finnish submarine, Vesikko.

There are about 900 permanent inhabitants on the islands, and 350 people work there year-round.

There is a minimum-security penal labor colony in Suomenlinna, whose inmates work on the maintenance and reconstruction of the fortifications. Only volunteer inmates who pledge non-use of controlled substances are accepted to the labour colony.

For the general public, Suomenlinna is served by ferries all year, and a service tunnel supplying heating, water and electricity was built in 1982. In the beginning of the 1990s, the tunnel was modified so that it can also be used for emergency transport.

Suomenlinna has been known as a location for avant-garde culture. In the mid-1980s, the Nordic Arts Centre was established on the island. Several buildings have been converted into artists' studios, which are let by the administration at reasonable rates. During the summer there is an art school for children. The performances of the Suomenlinna summer theater regularly draw full houses.

Between 2 and 6 September 2015, the Finnish postal service ran a test of the use of drones to deliver parcels between Helsinki and Suomenlinna.

Timeline 

 1748: Building of Sveaborg (Fortress of Svea/Sweden – Swedish), later to be named Suomenlinna in 1918 (Fortress of Finland – Finnish),  begins under command of Augustin Ehrensvärd.
 1808: Sveaborg surrenders to Russia without any opposition during the Finnish War.
 1809: Treaty of Fredrikshamn: Finland becomes part of Russia.
 1855: Crimean War: Anglo-French navy bombards Suomenlinna and causes substantial damage.
 1906: Viapori Rebellion: Russian soldiers plan to depose the tsar.
 1914–1917: A ring of ground and sea fortifications, called Krepost Sveaborg, is built around Helsinki.
 1917: Finland becomes independent after the Russian Revolution.
 1918: Name Suomenlinna becomes the official name of the fortress in Finnish while retaining its Swedish name Sveaborg in Swedish. Prison camp of Red rebels is located in Suomenlinna after the Finnish Civil War.
 1921 Valtion lentokonetehdas (State Aircraft Factory) started building airplanes and powered ice sleighs in Suomenlinna for the Finnish Air Force. In 1936 the factory moved to Tampere.
 1973: Suomenlinna becomes civil administration area.
 1991: Suomenlinna becomes a UNESCO World Heritage Site.

In Literature 
The Finnish-Swedish poet Johan Ludvig Runeberg wrote a poem called Sveaborg, one of the 35 short poems that together constitute his epic The Tales of Ensign Stål. It includes the following two verses about the fortress, which allude specifically to the "Gustav's Sword" (Gustavssvärd) bastion and its guns:

Sveaborg is also mentioned in the lyrics of Gunnar Wennerberg's 1849 hymn O Gud, som styrer folkens öden ("Oh God, who steers the people's fate"), in which Sweden's "age-old freedom" is described as being "...our protection in gloomy dangers, our consolation in every bleached sorrow, our defence against the hegemon's forces, and stronger than Sveaborg". As these words were written forty years after the Swedish cession of Finland to Russia, the use of Sveaborg as a simile has deliberately historic overtones.

George R. R. Martin wrote a short story about the surrender of Viapori, "The Fortress", when he was a college student. It was published in his 2007 volume of short stories, Dreamsongs.

See also 
 Battle of Suomenlinna
 Krepost Sveaborg
 List of castles in Finland
 List of fortifications
 Military Museum's Manege
 Suomenlinna church
 Walhalla-orden

Sources

References

Bibliography

External links

Suomenlinna official site
Suomenlinna Historical Society Official Site
Photographs from Suomenlinna
Fortifications of Suomenlinna 
More information on Suomenlinna
Panoramic view of the King's Gate in Suomenlinna
Sveaborg at Northern Fortress
Suomenlinna Video
Picturesque walking tour at Suomenlinna

 Link to satellite imagery of fortifications at Suomenlinna, via Google
The Association of Castles and Museums around the Baltic Sea

 
Landmarks in Finland
Forts in Finland
Forts in Sweden
Buildings and structures in Helsinki
Islands of Helsinki
Ullanlinna district
Finnish War
Russian and Soviet Navy bases
1748 establishments in Finland
World Heritage Sites in Finland
Tourist attractions in Helsinki
Coastal fortifications
Sea forts